Julian Jackson may refer to:

Julian Jackson (geographer) (1790–1853), British geographer
Julian T. Jackson (born 1954), British historian
Julian Jackson (boxer) (born 1960), boxer from the U.S. Virgin Islands